Häcki is a surname. Notable people with the surname include: 

Caroline Häcki (born 1982), Swiss dressage rider
Lena Häcki (born 1995), Swiss biathlete

See also
Hackl